The 2006 New Zealand Grand Prix was an open wheel racing car race held at Teretonga Park, near Invercargill on 15 January 2006.

It was the fifty first New Zealand Grand Prix and was open to Toyota Racing Series cars (based on international Formula 3 regulations). The event was also the third race of the third round of the 2005–06 Toyota Racing Series.

Classification 
Results as follows:

Notes 
Pole position: Jay Howard – 0'55.432
Fastest lap: Andy Knight – 1'01.545

References

External links
 Toyota Racing Series

New Zealand Grand Prix
Grand Prix
Toyota Racing Series